The 1983 Australian Grand Prix was a race for Australian Formula 1 cars held at Calder Park Raceway on 13 November 1983.

It was the forty eighth Australian Grand Prix and the fourth to be held at Calder. The race was also the sixth and final round of the 1983 Australian Drivers' Championship. The title had already been secured by Alfredo Costanzo as he had been twenty points ahead of Andrew Miedecke after winning the previous event at Winton Raceway.

Brazilian driver Roberto Moreno won his second Australian Grand Prix in three years. Local Ralt RT4 driver John Smith finished second, with French Formula One driver Jacques Laffite finishing third.

As of the 2016 Australian Grand Prix, Smith's second placing was the last time an Australian driver has finished on the podium of the Australian Grand Prix. The best finish since by an Australian was Alfie Costanzo's fourth place in 1984 and Mark Webber finishing fourth in 2012. Daniel Ricciardo finished second on the road in the 2014 Australian Grand Prix but was disqualified post race for breaching the maximum fuel limit and using an unauthorised method of measuring fuel consumption.

Classification 
Results as follows:

Qualifying

Race

Notes 
Pole position: Roberto Moreno – 0'39.49
Fastest lap: Alan Jones – 0'39.54

References

Grand Prix
Australian Grand Prix
Australian Grand Prix